The Völkner incident describes the murder of the German-born Protestant missionary Carl Sylvius Völkner in New Zealand in 1865 and what was seen by some to be the consequent miscarriage of justice by the Government of New Zealand during the New Zealand Wars.

Background
The Battle of Te Ranga, on 21 June 1864, was the last major conflict of the Tauranga Campaign and is said to mark the effective end of the fighting involved with the Invasion of the Waikato. It left an uneasy peace – not so much a peace as an absence of conflict, one that lasted for several months. This period saw two significant changes in disposition of the warring parties.

The Pai Marire (or Hauhau) movement, a syncretic religious group, was gaining ground and converts among the East Coast Māori. Pai Mārire began in 1862 as a combination of Christianity and traditional Māori beliefs. Originally peaceful, a sub-branch known as Hauhau became violent after experiencing Christian hypocrisy.

Meanwhile, the Imperial Troops were fighting their last campaign in New Zealand before being withdrawn to garrison duty and then complete withdrawal from New Zealand. At the same time the Colonial Militia were being reorganised and rearmed to take up the slack.

Völkner's murder

Among the Māori community, Völkner was rumoured to be a government spy. It was thought he sent Governor George Grey a plan of a pa near Te Awamutu where British troops burned women and children alive in a whare that had been converted to a church. The wife and two daughters of Kereopa were among the victims. Pai Mārire (or Hauhau) arrived in the Ōpōtiki area of the Bay of Plenty in February 1865. On 2 March Protestant missionary Carl Völkner discovered that his Māori congregation had moved on from Christianity to Pai Mārire (or Hauhau). Like many Europeans in isolated communities, Völkner had sent reports of anti-Government activity to the governor. Although warned to stay away from the town, on his next visit he was captured, put on trial and hanged from a tree, and his body was decapitated an hour later. Kereopa Te Rau, a Hauhau, was alleged to have re-entered the church and conducted a service with Völkner's head in the pulpit beside him. He was also alleged to have plucked out the dead missionary's eyes and swallowed them. One eye allegedly represented Parliament and the other the Queen and British law. News of the murder caused great alarm and anger among Pākehā.

Response
For several months nothing happened—then came the capture of Weraroa Pa—the relief of the siege of Pipiriki in August 1865 that virtually ended that phase of the Second Taranaki War. This freed up the militia for action elsewhere.

In September 1865, the forces then available to the New Zealand government, some 500 men, were transported by HMS Eclipse from Wanganui through Cook Strait, around the East Cape to Ōpōtiki. The composition of this force was significant. There were four companies of militia, a troop of cavalry and a contingent of Ngāti Hau warriors led by Te Keepa Te Rangihiwinui. These were the units that had already been campaigning together during the Taranaki War and had a history of successful cooperation and mutual respect.

The landing at Ōpōtiki was accomplished with difficulty. One of the ships ran aground on a falling tide and came under fire from the shore. Eventually it had to be abandoned and the crew and militia waded ashore but it was another twenty-four hours before the other ships were able to land their men and supplies.

As soon as they were established and the snipers driven away, the militia occupied the church where Völkner had been murdered. While some of the Pākehā soldiers worked at turning this into a fortress, the others with Keepa and the Ngāti Hau were turned loose on the countryside. They employed the military tactic of denying the enemy food supplies, keeping what they needed and destroying the rest. Beyond a few muskets the East Coast Hauhau lacked many modern weapons with which to defend themselves. This accounts for the numerous one-sided battles and the Hauhau resorting to attempted treachery to defeat the government forces. It was made clear to them that these depredations would continue until the men responsible for the murder of Völkner were captured or surrendered. But the man they wanted most, Kereopa, had retreated to Tuhoe lands in the Urewera mountains and had no intention of surrendering.

Aftermath
By the end of October the local tribe's position was desperate. Some twenty of its chiefs surrendered and were shipped to Auckland for trial. Five of them received the death penalty and were hanged the following year. Large areas of land around Ōpōtiki were confiscated under the New Zealand Settlements Act of 1863 and sold to settlers.

In the early 1870s, the Ureweras were invaded by the government forces searching for Te Kooti and the Tuhoe were effectively conquered and subdued. They were forced to yield Kereopa to Ropata Wahawaha, and he was tried and hanged for Völkner's murder on 5 January 1872. Some Crown witnesses in the trial were given immunity from prosecution in exchange for their testimony, and Kereopa had no defence witnesses because the Crown would not pay for their travel from Napier. The jury took only about 15 minutes to return their verdict. Kereopa's iwi Ngati Rangiwewehi say that the trial had a predetermined outcome and was a miscarriage of justice.

In 1993, Justice Minister Doug Graham delivered an apology to Te Whakatōhea along with an official pardon of Mokomoko, one of the chiefs hanged. In 1996, the New Zealand Government signed a Deed of Settlement, acknowledging and apologising for the wrongful invasion and confiscation of Te Whakatōhea lands, and the subsequent economic, cultural and developmental devastation suffered by the iwi. In 1998 the New Zealand government offered the Whakatōhea iwi NZ$40 million as compensation for all their historical claims including the invasion and the confiscation of land following the Völkner Incident; however the offer was not accepted. Te Whakatōhea are presently preparing to negotiate a full settlement with the New Zealand Government. As part of the settlement of neighbouring iwi Ngāti Awa's claims in 2003, the Völkner Rocks near Whakaari/White Island were renamed "Te Paepae Aotea (Völkner Rocks)".

Kereopa was posthumously pardoned in November 2014. This means that Kereopa is no longer guilty of the murder of Völkner. This pardon was part of the Ngāti Rangiwewehi Treaty of Waitangi settlement.

See also
East Cape War

References

Further reading
 Barthorp, Michael (1979). To face the daring Māori. Hodder and Stoughton.
 Belich, James (1988). The New Zealand wars. Penguin.
 Belich, James (1996) Making peoples. Penguin Press.
 Cowan, J., & Hasselberg, P. D. (1983) The New Zealand wars. New Zealand Government Printer. (Originally published 1922)
 Lyall, A. C., (1979) Whakatohea of Opotiki. A.H. & A.W. Reed.
 Maxwell, Peter (2000). Frontier, the battle for the North Island of New Zealand. Celebrity Books.
 Simpson, Tony (1979). Te Riri Pakeha. Hodder and Stoughton.
 Sinclair, Keith (ed.) (1996). The Oxford illustrated history of New Zealand (2nd ed.) Wellington: Oxford University Press.
 Vaggioli, Dom Felici (2000). History of New Zealand and its inhabitants, Trans. J. Crockett. Dunedin: University of Otago Press. Original Italian publication, 1896.
 Ranginui Walker, Ōpōtiki-Mai-Tawhiti, Capital of Whakatōhea. Penguin, 2007. .
 Peter Wells, Journey to a Hanging. Random House/Vintage, 2014. .
"The people of many peaks: The Māori biographies". (1990). From The dictionary of New Zealand biographies, Vol. 1, 1769–1869. Bridget Williams Books and Department of Internal Affairs, New Zealand.

External links
Pai Marire and the death of Carl Völkner, 2 March 1865

Murder in New Zealand
Conflicts in 1865
New Zealand Wars
1865 in New Zealand
History of the Bay of Plenty Region
March 1865 events
1865 murders in New Zealand